Divrazm (also Romanized as Dīvrazm; also known as Davah Zīm) is a village in Sarajuy-ye Shomali Rural District, in the Central District of Maragheh County, East Azerbaijan Province, Iran. At the 2006 census, its population was 280, in 69 families.

References 

Towns and villages in Maragheh County